Mike Nichols is an American filmmaker, producer, comedian, and theatre director.

He is one of the few entertainers to have won the EGOT, the Emmy, Grammy, Oscar, and Tony for television, film and theatre. Nichols received five Academy Award nominations, winning Best Director for The Graduate (1967). He was also nominated for his work on Who's Afraid of Virginia Woolf? (1966), Silkwood (1983), Working Girl (1988), and for producing The Remains of the Day (1993). For his collaborations with Elaine May, Nichols was nominated for three Grammy Awards, winning for Best Comedy Album in 1962. Nichols is also known for his extensive work on Broadway, receiving 16 Tony Award nominations and winning 8 Tony Awards for Barefoot in the Park (1964), Luv/The Odd Couple (1965), Plaza Suite (1968), The Prisoner of Second Avenue (1972), Annie (1977), The Real Thing (1984), Monty Python's Spamalot (2005), and Death of a Salesman (2012). Nichols also received Primetime Emmy Awards for Wit (2001) and Angels in America (2003).

E.G.O.T.

Emmy Award

Grammy Awards

Academy Award 
Also often referred to as an Oscar.

Tony Award

Major associations

British Academy Film Awards

Golden Globe Awards

Drama Desk Award

Honorary Awards 
1989 - Golden Plate Award of the American Academy of Achievement presented by Awards Council member Diane Sawyer
1999 - Film Society of Lincoln Center Gala tribute
2001 - Peabody Award – Wit
2003 - Kennedy Center Honors
2010 - American Film Institute Lifetime Achievement Award

References 

Nichols, Mike